The Jewish revolt against Heraclius was part of the Byzantine–Sasanian War of 602–628 and is considered the last serious Jewish attempt to gain autonomy in Palaestina Prima prior to modern times.

Following the Battle of Antioch in 613, Shahrbaraz led his forces through Palaestina Secunda and into Palaestina Prima provinces. In 614, Shahrbaraz conquered Caesarea Maritima, the administrative capital of the Palaestina Prima province. The Persian army reinforced by Jewish forces led by Nehemiah ben Hushiel and Benjamin of Tiberias would shortly capture Jerusalem without resistance. After only a few months a Christian revolt occurred. Nehemiah ben Hushiel and his council of sixteen people were killed along with many other Jews, some throwing themselves off the city walls. Christians were able to briefly retake the city before the walls were breached by Shahrbaraz's forces who lay siege to the city. According to the Armenian bishop and historian Sebeos the siege resulted in a total Christian death toll of 17,000, Christian sources later exaggerated the extent of the massacre, claiming a death toll as high as 90,000. In addition 35,000 or 37,000 people including the patriarch Zacharias are said to have been deported to Mesopotamia. The city is said to have been burnt down. However, neither wide spread burning nor destruction of churches have been found in the archaeological record.

Bands of Jews from Jerusalem, Tiberias, Galilee, Damascus, and even from Cyprus, united and undertook an incursion against Tyre, having been invited by the 4,000 Jewish inhabitants of that city to surprise and massacre the Christians on Easter night. The Jewish army is said to have consisted of 20,000 men. The expedition, however, miscarried, as the Christians of Tyre learned of the impending danger, and seized the 4,000 Tyrian Jews as hostages. The Jewish invaders destroyed the churches around Tyre, an act which the Christians avenged by killing two thousand of their Jewish prisoners. The besiegers, to save the remaining prisoners, withdrew. The Jews had hoped that Khosrau II would give them all of the Land of Israel in exchange for their support. By 617 CE the Persians had reversed their policy and sided with the Christians over the Jews, probably because of pressure from Mesopotamian Christians in Persia itself.

By 622 CE, the Byzantine Emperor Heraclius had assembled an army to retake the territory lost to the Sasanian Empire. In 628, following the deposition of Khosrau II, Kavadh II made peace with Heraclius, but Kavadh II would only have a brief reign. It is said that Benjamin, a man of immense wealth and one of the leaders of the failed revolt, accompanied Heraclius on his voyage to Jerusalem, was persuaded to convert, and obtained a general pardon for himself and the Jews. On 21 March 630, Emperor Heraclius marched in triumph into Jerusalem with the True Cross. A general massacre of the Jewish population ensued. The massacre devastated the Jewish communities of the Galilee and Jerusalem. Only those Jews who could flee to the mountains or Egypt are said to have been spared.

Archaeological work doesn't support the written sources, which claim that the conflict lead to large-scale massacres perpetrated against Christian and Jewish communities in Jerusalem and the destruction of churches in the city (see below).

Demographic impact
Some historians believe the war reduced and weakened the Christian population not just in Jerusalem but across the Near East, allowing the success of the following Arab invasion. However, over the past thirty years the archaeological evidence has not supported the ancient manuscripts which record the devastation of the Christian community in Jerusalem.

Jerusalem is said to have been burnt down. However, neither widespread burning nor destruction of churches have been found in the archaeological record. 
Despite the claims of large scale destruction, the archaeological evidence does not reveal layers of destruction associated with the Persian conquest. There was also no hard evidence found for the widespread destruction of churches.

A significant number of burial sites were allocated according to Strategius. A mass burial grave at Mamilla cave was discovered in 1989 by Israeli archeologist Ronny Reich, near the site where Strategius recorded the massacre took place. The human remains were in poor condition containing a minimum of 526 individuals. Other mass burial sites have also been found although they cannot be accurately dated to the Persian conquest of Jerusalem. Yet, excavations of Jerusalem show a continuous habitation in Jerusalem neighborhoods and essentially little impact of population during the period of Persian governorship. As stated by archaeologist Gideon Avni:

... all excavated sites in Jerusalem show a clear pattern of continuity, with no evidence for destruction by the Persian conquest of 614 or the Arab conquest of 636.

Demographic continuity might have resulted from population exchange by the victorious Jewish rebels, but apparently also the Christian habitation remained relatively constant, despite the disturbance by the Persian conquest, and no significant impact on the population of Jerusalem was made during the following period of Sassanid dominance.

Background
Jews and Samaritans were persecuted frequently by the Byzantines (eastern Romans) resulting in numerous revolts. Byzantine religious propaganda developed strong anti-Jewish elements. In several cases Jews tried to help support the Sasanian advance. A pogrom in Antioch in 608 would lead to a Jewish revolt in 610 which was crushed. Jews also revolted in both Tyre and Acre in 610. The Jews of Tyre were massacred in reprisal. Unlike in earlier times when Jews had supported Christians in the fight against Shapur I, the Byzantines had now become viewed as oppressors.

The territory is said to have had a substantial indigenous Jewish population at this time. James Parkes estimates that if ten percent of the Jewish population joined the revolt and the figure of 20,000 rebels is correct then 200,000 Jews were living in the territory at the time. Likewise Michael Avi-Yonah used the figure of Jewish combatants to arrive at an estimate of the total Jewish population. He gives a figure of 150,000 to 200,000 living in 43 Jewish settlements. Salo Wittmayer Baron in 1957 questioned the reliability of the number of Jewish combatants recorded in ancient texts and the population estimates based on these texts, although he does not discount the estimate altogether. He reasons that the 43 Jewish settlements Avi-Yonah lists may indeed be supportive of a minority Jewish presence of 10 to 15%. Jacob Neusner similarly accepts this estimate. In 1950 Israel Cohen gave an estimate of double these values, estimating that between 300,000 and 400,000 Jews were in the land. More recently Moshe Gil has postulated that the combined Jewish and Samaritan population was a majority in the early 7th century.

Jews are thought to have been concentrated in the Galilee during this time period. The Galilee is said to have contained several cities which are thought to have been populated largely by a homogenous Jewish demographic, Tiberias being a center of Jewish learning. In fact the title of the Jerusalem Talmud is something of a misnomer as it was actually compiled in Tiberias, as Jews were banned from Jerusalem.

Timeline

Galilee and Caesarea
Following the Battle of Antioch in 613, Shahrbaraz led his forces through Palaestina Secunda and into Palaestina Prima provinces. Shahrbaraz conquered Caesarea Maritima, the administrative capital of the Palaestina Prima province. When Shahrbaraz had entered Galilee, a significant Jewish revolt took place with some 20,000 Jewish rebels joining him in the war against the Byzantines. Depending on the chronicler figures of either 20,000 or 26,000 are given.

The Sasanian Persians were joined by Nehemiah ben Hushiel and Benjamin of Tiberias (a man of immense wealth), who enlisted and armed Jewish soldiers from Tiberias, Nazareth and the mountain cities of Galilee, and together with a band of Arabs and additional Jews from southern parts of the country they marched on Jerusalem.

Capture of Jerusalem

The Persian army reinforced by Jewish forces led by Nehemiah ben Hushiel and Benjamin of Tiberias would capture Jerusalem without resistance.

The capture of Jerusalem was interpreted by Jewish writers in a messianic context. Sacrifices may even have been renewed on the Temple Mount. Control of the city was handed to Nehemiah ben Hushiel and Benjamin of Tiberias. Nehemiah was then appointed the ruler of Jerusalem. He began making arrangements for the building of the Third Temple, and sorting out genealogies to establish a new High Priesthood.

Christian rebellion
After only a few months a Christian revolt occurred. Nehemiah ben Hushiel and his council of sixteen righteous were killed along with many other Jews, some throwing themselves off the city walls.

Following the outburst of violence in Jerusalem, the surviving Jews fled to Shahrbaraz's encampment at Caesarea. Christians were able to briefly retake the city before the walls were breached by Shahrbaraz's forces who lay siege to the city. Sources vary on how long the siege lasted. Depending on the source it lasted 19, 20 or 21 days.

According to the Armenian bishop and historian Sebeos the siege resulted in a total Christian death toll of 17,000, 4,518 prisoners were massacred near Mamilla reservoir per Antiochus Strategos. James Howard-Johnston argues that the massacre occurred in the context of the returning Jews attempting to round up the ring leaders who had led the earlier pogrom. Christian sources later exaggerated the extent of the massacre, claiming a death toll as high as 90,000. In addition 35,000 or 37,000 people including the patriarch Zacharias are said to have been deported to Mesopotamia. The city is said to have been burnt down. However, neither wide spread burning nor destruction of churches have been found in the archaeological record. The search for the True Cross is said to have involved the torture of clergymen. Once found, the True Cross was carried off to Ctesiphon.

Unlike Sebeos, Antiochus uses polemical language. Antiochus wrote that the Jews offered to help the Christian captives escape death if they "become Jews and deny Christ." They refused. In anger, the Jews then purchased Christians to kill them. A significant number of burial sites were allocated according to Antiochus. A mass burial grave at Mamilla cave was discovered in 1989 by Israeli archeologist Ronny Reich near the site, where Antiochus recorded the massacre took place. The human remains were in poor condition containing a minimum of 526 individuals.

Jewish expedition to Tyre
According to Eutychius (887-940), the Jews launched an expedition against Tyre. Bands of Jews from Jerusalem, Tiberias, Galilee, Damascus, and even from Cyprus, united and undertook an incursion against Tyre, having been invited by the 4,000 Jewish inhabitants of that city to surprise and massacre the Christians on Easter night. The Jewish army is said to have consisted of 20,000 men. The expedition, however, miscarried, as the Christians of Tyre learned of the impending danger, and seized the 4,000 Tyrian Jews as hostages. The Jewish invaders destroyed the churches around Tyre, an act which the Christians avenged by killing two thousand of their Jewish prisoners. The besiegers, to save the remaining prisoners, withdrew, having had to suffer the humiliation of watching the heads of the Jewish captives as they were thrown over the walls.

Jewish control of Jerusalem
The Jews had hoped that Khosrau II would give them all of the Land of Israel in exchange for their support. However they were too few to make this a reality. For a time they are said to have enjoyed relative dominance in Jerusalem, although it may have been in a state of anarchy. By 617 CE the Persians had reversed their policy and sided with the Christians over the Jews, probably because of pressure from Mesopotamian Christians in Persia itself. Further Jewish settlers were banned from settling in or around Jerusalem and a small synagogue on the Temple Mount was also demolished. Instead of supporting the Jews, Khosrau is said to have imposed heavy taxes on them.

Byzantine return to Jerusalem
By 622 CE, the Byzantine Emperor Heraclius had assembled an army to retake the territory lost to the Sasanian Empire. In 628, following the deposition of Khosrau II, Kavadh II made peace with Heraclius, but Kavadh II would only have a brief reign. The conquered city and the Cross would remain in Sasanian hands until they were returned by Shahrbaraz. On 21 March 630, Heraclius marched in triumph into Jerusalem with the True Cross. Ancient manuscripts date Heraclius' entry into Jerusalem as 21 March 629. Modern scholars increasingly doubt this date for a number of reasons.

Dating Byzantine return
Walter Emil Kaegi puts the death of Kavadh II in September 629. The Persian succession between 628 and 632 becomes confused and different historians give different succession timelines. In the period following the death of Kavadh II, up to six different individual are said to have reigned, these are Ardashir III, Shahrbaraz, Borandukht, Shapur-i Shahrvaraz, Azarmidokht and Farrukh Hormizd. Negotiations continued with Shahrbaraz being the real power. Antiochus records that Heraclius made an agreement with Ardashir III with Shahrbaraz acting as intermediary, Nikephoros gives a date of July 629 at Arabissos. Walter Emil Kaegi sees this July 629 meeting as representing an earlier negotiation with Shahrbaraz preceding the death of Kavadh II. Nikephoros exaggerated and confused the record by claiming that Hormizd succeeded Kavadh II. Claiming Hormizd sent his son to Heraclius' court.

Heraclius was in Constantinople in 629 where he issued a "novel", or law, that went into effect on 1 April 629. At Arabissos Heraclius and Shahrbaraz would agree on new borders. To seal the deal Shahrbaraz's son Niketas and another of his brothers came to live at the Byzantine court, having been held for a time in central Mesopotamia practically as hostages. They arrived along with the True Cross. The Holy Sponge was attached to the cross in a special ceremony in Constantinople on 14 September 629. The Holy Lance followed reaching Constantinople on 28 October 629. It is probable that at this time, Niketas converted to Christianity; as he was his father's heir-apparent, this opened the prospect of the Christianization of Persia should Shahrbaraz be able to maintain his power there.

Heraclius would not have entered Jerusalem while the Persian troop presence persisted. Heraclius brother Theodore had encounter resistance at Edessa and Heraclius would not have exposed himself to similar danger. Shahrbaraz had Ardashir III assassinated and took control of the Persian Empire from 27 April 630 to 9 June 630. The 630 date would also have the advantage of matching the date for the Fast of Heraclius.

Discourse

Reconciliation attempts
Heraclius came as victor into the country and the Jews of Tiberias and Nazareth, under the leadership of Benjamin of Tiberias, surrendered and asked for his protection. It is said that Benjamin even accompanied Heraclius on his voyage to Jerusalem and Benjamin was persuaded to convert, Benjamin obtained a general pardon for himself and the Jews. He was baptized in Nablus in the house of Eustathios, an influential Christian. However once Heraclius reached Jerusalem he was persuaded to go back on his promise to Benjamin of Tiberias. According to Eutychius (887-940), the Christians population and monks of Jerusalem convinced the Emperor to break his word. Some modern scholars ascribe the story of the "Oath of Heraclius" to the realm of legend, doubting that Heraclius ever made such a promise, or else view his alleged reluctance to break the oath as a product of later apologists.

Massacre of the Jews
Jews were expelled from Jerusalem and were not allowed to settle within a three-mile radius. A general massacre of the Jewish population ensued. The massacre devastated the Jewish communities of the Galilee and Jerusalem. Only those Jews who could flee to the mountains or Egypt are said to have been spared.

In atonement for the violation of the emperor's oath to the Jews, the monks are said to have pledged themselves to a yearly fast, which is still observed by the Copts, called the Fast of Heraclius.

Conversion policy of Heraclius
In 628, Heraclius reportedly rescinded a decision made by his brother which would have exterminated the Jews of Edessa for supporting the Persians. Robert Bonfil suggests that Heraclius’ change of heart in 630 cannot be separated from the "Jewish Question" and the anti-Jewish world view ubiquitous to Christian thought at that time. He sees the decision as being based more on politics than religion. Heraclius is one of the few Byzantine emperors to have had an imperial conversion campaign. The rarity of such campaigns is thought to be due to Christian theological constraints. In Christian apocalyptic literature, some Jews must remain until the end of time. Christian theologians of the time also had other core theological reasons for rejecting the forced conversion of Jews.

In another legend, Heraclius' astrologers are said to have revealed to him that a circumcised people would conquer his empire. Heraclius set out to forcibly convert the Jews of the Byzantine Empire, reportedly advising his friend Dagobert, king of the Franks, to do likewise.

Aftermath

Following the defeat of the Persian Empire the territory would not remain in Byzantine hands for long. By 638, the Arabs would conquer Jerusalem. Caesarea would remain under Byzantine control until 640. The Arab Islamic Empire under Caliph Umar conquered the lands of Mesopotamia, the Levant, and Egypt.

In apocalyptic literature
The events of the Persian-Byzantine struggle in the Levant and the consequent Arab conquest inspired several apocalyptic Jewish writings of the early Middle Ages. Helping to popularize the idea of a war messiah, the Messiah ben Joseph, who would die paving the way for the Messiah ben David. Among these are the Apocalypse of Zerubbabel, which is partially attributed to the events between the Persian conquest of Palaestina and subsequent Muslim conquest of Syria.

The Tiburtine Sibyl records that the Jews of the Byzantine Empire would be converted in one hundred and twenty years, seeming to refer to these occurrences, since about one hundred and twenty years elapsed from the time of the Persian war under Anastasius, in 505, to the victory of Heraclius in 628. Some scholars see similarities between these Christian works and their Jewish counterparts.

See also
 List of conflicts in the Near East
 Jewish–Roman wars 66–136 CE
 Jewish revolt against Gallus 352 CE
 Samaritan Revolts 484–572 CE
 Yehud Medinata

References

610s in the Byzantine Empire
620s in the Byzantine Empire
7th-century rebellions
7th-century Judaism
Jewish Persian and Iranian history
Byzantine–Sasanian War of 602–628
Holy Land during Byzantine rule
Jews and Judaism in the Byzantine Empire
Jewish rebellions
Medieval Jerusalem
Religion in the Byzantine Empire
610s in the Sasanian Empire
620s in the Sasanian Empire
Judaism in the Sasanian Empire